Castlegar GAA is a Gaelic Athletic Association club located in the parish of Castlegar in County Galway, Ireland.  The club is almost exclusively concerned with the game of hurling.

Overview

It is believed that hurling has been played in Castlegar since the 1880s.  No records exist regarding hurling in the area prior to that decade, however, local folklore has it that the parish had a hurling team prior to 1880.  Most of the matches played by Castlegar in those days were played in Claregalway, Turloughmore and Oranmore. At the time the Gaelic Athletic Association was founded in 1884, Castlegar was considered to be the best team in the west of the city of Galway.

Hurling

Honours

All-Ireland Senior Club Hurling Championships:
 Winner (1): 1980
Connacht Senior Club Hurling Championships:
 Winner (4): 1974, 1975, 1981, 1986
Galway Senior Club Hurling Championships:
 Winner (17): 1936, 1937, 1938, 1939, 1940, 1944, 1950, 1952, 1953, 1957, 1958, 1967, 1969, 1972, 1973, 1979, 1984
Galway Under-21 Hurling Championships:
 Winner (5): 1967, 1974, 1982, 1999, 2000
Galway Minor Hurling Championships:
 Winner (7): 1949, 1953, 1965, 1982, 1985, 2000, 2017

Notable players

 Joe Connolly
 John Connolly
 Michael Connolly
 Jimmy Hegarty
 Ger Farragher
 Mick King
 Ted Murphy 
 Donall Barry

1979-80 All-Ireland champions

External links
 Castlegar GAA site

Gaelic games clubs in County Galway
Hurling clubs in County Galway